City of Industry is a 1997  American neo-noir crime thriller film starring Harvey Keitel, Stephen Dorff and Timothy Hutton. It is directed by John Irvin, produced by Evzen Kolar and Ken Solarz and written by Solarz.

Plot
Retired thief, Roy Egan (Harvey Keitel), comes out of retirement to help his youngest brother, Lee (Timothy Hutton), with a jewelry heist in Palm Springs. Along for the ride are hired muscle, Jorge Montana (Wade Dominguez), and wheelman, Skip Kovich (Stephen Dorff). The heist goes down the next day and, thanks to Jorge's scrambling of the police monitors and traffic signals, their getaway is successful.

In Skip's motel room, his girlfriend, Gena (Dana Barron), voices how little money he will be receiving from the heist. At the trailer park Lee and Jorge are having some beers and talking about how much each will make when Skip shoots them. Roy, who was in the bathroom, hears the gunshots, slams the door on Skip, and runs for it. Roy steals a car and heads to Los Angeles where he rents a room and starts plotting. He stops at Jorge's house along the way to inform his wife, Rachel (Famke Janssen), about her husband's death and to ask if she knows Skip's whereabouts. Skip employs Odell and his crew as protection against Roy, and proceeds to deal with his debt to loan shark Harvey (Elliott Gould). Harvey is connected with the Chinese mob and Skip convinces Harvey to use his connections to track down Roy, in exchange for more money on top of what he already owes him. Roy is found by two members of the Chinese mob and kidnapped but he frees himself, killing his captors in the process.

Rachel finds a bruised and bloody Roy lying in her yard. She cleans him up and Roy offers her $5,000 to take care of him. Once he recovers, Rachel asks for $100,000 instead. Roy refuses at first, but when she gives him Jorge's address book full of contacts – including Skip – he accepts. Rachel also tells Roy where the Chinese mob launders cash and gives him a Saint Christopher medal for protection. Roy attacks the man in charge, Uncle Luke (François Chau), and takes Skip's money, but unknowingly leaves his motel key behind. Uncle Luke tells Skip about the key Roy left behind.  Chinese mobsters later attempt to kill Roy in his motel room, but Roy is waiting for them.

Skip kidnaps Rachel. He goes to a trailer where his girlfriend Gena finds that Odell has sent two of his guys to get the money Skip owes them. They take Gena hostage and Skip kills them both, purposefully killing Gena in the process. Skip and Roy plan to meet at a refinery and when Roy arrives, he gets into a gun fight with the mob who are after Skip. Roy takes them out, but is severely wounded, although still able to beat Skip to death with his bare hands. He rescues Rachel who speeds a barely conscious Roy to a hospital. When she returns, both Roy and her car are gone, but he has left her money in a duffel bag. Rachel and her children bury Jorge and relocate to Port Arthur, Texas. One day, the postman delivers a small package to her. She opens it and finds the religious medal she gave Roy, assuring her that he's alive.

Cast

 Harvey Keitel as Roy Egan
 Timothy Hutton as Lee Egan
 Stephen Dorff as Skip Kovich
 Famke Janssen as Rachel Montana
 Wade Dominguez as Jorge Montana
 Michael Jai White as Odell Williams
 Lucy Liu as Cathi Rose
 François Chau as Uncle Luke
 Dana Barron as Gena
 Elliott Gould as Harvey

Reception

Critical response
The film received mixed reviews, and holds a 43% film score at Rotten Tomatoes based on 14 reviews.

References

External links
 
 
 
 
 

1997 films
1997 crime thriller films
American crime drama films
American chase films
1990s English-language films
Films directed by John Irvin
Films set in California
Films shot in California
American independent films
American neo-noir films
Orion Pictures films
Largo Entertainment films
1997 independent films
Triad films
1990s American films
1990s Hong Kong films